Zee Smile was a general entertainment channel based in India. It was launched on 11 September 2004. The channel was launched by Zee Network as Smile TV, but on 28 March 2005 as part of Zee Network's revamp, the channel was renamed as Zee Smile.

In March 2015, Zee Smile announced a revamp with Shailja Kejriwal in charge of the project. The channel was shut down on 15 January 2016. It continues to telecast in USA through Sling TV only and airs different programming until removed from 2021.

History

The channel was established by Zee Entertainment Enterprises by Ashish Kaul, VP of Corporate Brand Development and Nitin Vaidya, business head of Smile TV. Along with sitcoms, the channel also broadcast game shows, comedy chat shows, and comedy movies. The channel also acquired various comic formats from other countries as well as Indian formats in a plan to generate more revenue.

Programming

Alvida Darling 
Angry Mohan
Bechara Big B
Comedy Ghanta
Fooltoo Paagal Hai
Gudgudee 
Hasne Bhi Do Yaron
Hello Friends
Hitler Didi
Home Sweet Home
Hum Paanch
Kahani Mein Ek Twist
Kareena Kareena
Kasamh Se
Khiladi No.1
Kross Connection hosted by Nasirr Khan
Kyonki Yeh Hasya Kavi Muqabla hosted by Nasirr Khan
Maayka
Nukkad
PA Saheb 
Pavitra Rishta
Pyaar Ishq Aur Mohabbat
Satrangi Sasural
Teri Bhi Chup Meri Bhi Chup'''Tumhari DishaUlta Pulta Ek MinuteVilaytee Bahu  Wagle Ki DuniyaWohYahan Main Ghar Ghar KheliYoyo''

References

External links
Zee Smile

Television stations in Mumbai
Zee Entertainment Enterprises
Television channels and stations established in 2004
Defunct television channels in India
2004 establishments in Maharashtra